Noort is a Dutch surname meaning "north". may refer to:

Ae-Ri Noort (born 1983), Dutch rowing coxswain
Saskia Noort (born 1967), Dutch crime-writer and freelance journalist

See also
North (surname)
Van Noort, surname

Dutch-language surnames
Toponymic surnames